Leslie Anne Anderson is a Cuban-American museum curator and art historian, notable for her scholarship and exhibitions of nineteenth-century European, American, and regional art.

Education 
Anderson received her Bachelor of Arts cum laude in history and an MA in art history from the University of Florida. She earned an MPhil from the CUNY Graduate Center in New York City. Her areas of research and expertise include nineteenth and twentieth-century art from Scandinavia, as well as other European and American regional paintings, drawings, and sculpture.

Career 
Anderson served as Samuel H. Kress Interpretive Fellow and then curatorial assistant of European and American painting, sculpture, and works on paper at the Indianapolis Museum of Art (Newfields) from 2011 until 2012 and 2014 through 2015. In June 2015, she became the curator of European, American, and regional art at the Utah Museum of Fine Art.

At the Utah Museum of Fine Art, Anderson was involved with putting together several nationally renowned exhibitions. The first exhibition, titled American and Regional Art: Mythmaking and Truth-Telling, is a major re-envisioning of the museum’s large collection of American regional art from Utah and other Western states. The exhibition earned Anderson a prestigious National Award for Excellence from the Association of Art Museum Curators. Anderson scrutinized the collection and included several renowned American and Indigenous artists such as Thomas Moran (1837–1926), Awa Tsireh (1898 – 1955), and Maria Martinez (1887–1980). The exhibition depicts the migration of people and the advancement of ideas and cultural discourse during the nineteenth century westward expansion. Anderson was also very conscious about including artists such as Edmonia Lewis (1844–1907) and Harriet Richards Harwood (1870–1922), who have been previously overlooked in the canon of American art history. Anderson acquired a pair of sculptural busts by Lewis for the Museum’s American art collection.

The second exhibition, Power Couples: The Pendant Format in Art, which was on view from July 11 through December 8, 2019, was selected by The Utah Review as one of the state’s top ten cultural moments of 2019 and won the Utah Museums Association Award for Excellence. The exhibition presented artworks from the sixteenth century to the twenty-first century that were created in pendant format, which are singular works like diptychs, which are presented in pairs. The selected works of art by artists such as Kerry James Marshall, Nina Katchadourian, Lorna Simpson, Gilbert Stuart, Konishi Hirosada, and Dirck Hals, reflected scenes from daily life, social structures, and spirituality throughout a myriad of cultures and societies.

In September 2019, Anderson was appointed as the director of collections, exhibitions, and programs at the National Nordic Museum. There, she has curated the exhibitions La Vaughn Belle: A History of Unruly Returns, which examines the legacy of Danish colonialism through Belle’s Chaney series, and the intergenerational exhibition M(other) Tongues: Bodhild and Las Hermanas Iglesias. She served as co-organizer for Among Forests and Lakes: Landscape Masterpieces from the Finnish National Gallery.

During the early stages of the COVID-19 pandemic, Anderson was instrumental in adapting the museum’s programing to support public health policies. She initiated the National Nordic Museum’s COVID-19 Oral History Project to record the experiences of individuals impacted by COVID-19 in Nordic countries and the American Pacific Northwest. Anderson also spearheaded the virtualization of educational content, delivering programs that teach the Museum’s core values of social justice and sustainability to an international audience.

Selected exhibitions 
At the National Nordic Museum

 M(other) Tongues: Bodhild and Las Hermanas Iglesias, November 4, 2021—January 30, 2022.
 Dines Carlsen: In His Own Manner, July 22, 2021—October 24, 2022.
 Among Forests and Lakes: Landscape Masterpieces from the Finnish National Gallery, May 6, 2021—October 17, 2022 (organized the National Nordic Museum’s presentation and the exclusive North American showing) 
 Sublime Sights: Ski Jumping and Nordic America (curated with Washington State Ski & Snowboard Museum), April 24, 2021—July 18, 2021.
 La Vaughn Belle: A History of Unruly Returns, October 8, 2020—April 11, 2021.

At the Utah Museum of Fine Arts

 Diego Rivera's La ofrenda, October 25, 2019—October 4, 2020.
 Power Couples: The Pendant Format in Art, July 11, 2019—December 8, 2019.
 American and Regional Art: Mythmaking & Truth-Telling, August 26, 2017—Present.

At the Indianapolis Museum of Art (Newfields)

 A Land Enchanted’: The Golden Age of Indiana Art, 1877–1902, December 18, 2015—May 14, 2017.

Selected publications 

 Anderson, Leslie Anne, and Alison DeRiemer. “Preserving a Pandemic: The National Nordic Museum’s COVID-19 Oral History Project,” Collections: A Journal for Museums and Archives Professionals. (Focus Issue: COVID-19 & Collections). Published online 12/21/20; print version February 2021.
 Anderson, Leslie Anne. Review of “Pictures of Longing: Photography and the Norwegian-American Migration,” Norwegian-American Studies Vol. 37, Number 1.
 Anderson, Leslie Anne. “Dating Miss Maude Adams, as L’Aiglon,” Panorama: Journal of the Association of Historians of American Art Vol. 4, Issue 2 (Fall 2018). 
 Anderson, Leslie Anne. “A Saint-Aubin Allegory Reconsidered,” Journal18 (October 2016).
 Anderson-Perkins, Leslie. “The Forgotten Pendant of Christian August Lorentzen’s Model School at the Academy,” Nineteenth-Century Art Worldwide Vol. 13 (Spring 2014).
 Anderson-Perkins, Leslie. “Picturing Artistic Practice at the Royal Danish Academy, 1826-1848,” Rutgers Art Review (2012): 2-16.

Awards 
Anderson has received several awards and honors including a Fulbright scholarship and American-Scandinavian Foundation Fellowship at the University of Copenhagen (2012–2013); a National Award for Excellence from the Association of Art Museum Curators (2018); and the Utah Museums Association Award for Excellence (2020).

References 

American curators
American women curators
American art historians
Museum people
Year of birth missing (living people)
Living people
21st-century American women